Chalermchai Kositpipat (born 15 February 1955) is a Thai visual artist. Primarily a painter, Chalermchai's works have been exhibited worldwide, and he is known for his use of Buddhist imagery in his art.

Biography

Chalermchai Kositpipat was born into a Sino-Lanna family. His father was a Chinese immigrant from Guangdong while his mother is Thai Chinese. He later attended Silpakorn University, which was Thailand's primary visual arts school. He graduated with a Bachelor of Fine Arts degree in Thai art in 1977.

He started out painting movie advertisements on billboards. His early murals mixed traditional Thai Buddhist temple art with contemporary images, which was controversial. Nonetheless, he was commissioned 1988 to paint murals for Wat Buddhapadipa in London. The murals took four years to complete and were controversial because of the contemporary styling. "I got complaints from everybody – from the [Thai] government, from monks and from other artists, saying that what I was doing was not Thai art" he was quoted as saying in 1998.

In 1980 Acharn Chalermchai Kositpipat visited Sri Lanka as his first foreign visit and stayed there for six months, studying Sri Lankan architecture, sculpture, painting and Buddhist temples. He was influenced by white statues and temples in Sri Lanka. Acharn Chalermchai worked closely with Sri Lanka's veteran artist Manju Sri. In 1980, Acharn Chalermchai had his own solo art exhibition in Lionel Wendt Art Gallery in Colombo, Sri Lanka. After the exhibition he brought those art pieces to Thailand and sold it all.

Eventually, his work became more accepted, with Thai King Bhumibol Adulyadej among his clients. One piece of his was sold for US$17,500 in 1998 at an auction of Thai art at Christie's Singapore. Another one of his pieces, Food Offering to Monks, sold for US$59,375 on March 7, 2018.

Among his works is Wat Rong Khun, an ornate white Buddhist temple being built in his native Chiang Rai Province. Work on the temple was started in 1997, and still continues.

"Only death can stop my dream but cannot stop my project" Chalermchai was quoted as saying about the temple, adding that he believes the work will give him "immortal life". He was the first visual arts honoree for the inaugural Silpathorn Award, created in 2004 to honor living Thai contemporary artists at mid-career. Later in 2011, he was honored by Thailand's National Culture Commission as a National Artist.

See also
 Luang Pu Bunleua Sulilat / Sala Keoku / Buddha Park
 Lek Viriyaphant / Sanctuary of Truth / Ancient Siam / Erawan Museum
 Visionary environments

References

External links
 Chalermchai Kositpipat at Rama 9 Art

1955 births
Living people
Buddhist artists
Chalermchai Kositpipat
Chalermchai Kositpipat
Chalermchai Kositpipat
Chalermchai Kositpipat
Chalermchai Kositpipat
Chalermchai Kositpipat
Chalermchai Kositpipat